2010 in the Philippines details events of note that happened in the Philippines in 2010.

Incumbents

 
 President:
Gloria Macapagal Arroyo (Lakas-Kampi-CMD) (until June 30)
Benigno Aquino III (Liberal) (starting June 30) 
 Vice President:
Noli de Castro (Independent) (until June 30)
Jejomar Binay (PDP-Laban) (starting June 30)
 Senate President: Juan Ponce Enrile
 House Speaker:
Prospero Nograles (until June 30)
Feliciano Belmonte, Jr. (starting July 26)
 Chief Justice:
Reynato Puno (until May 17)
Renato Corona (starting May 17)
 Philippine Congress:
14th Congress of the Philippines (until June 4)
15th Congress of the Philippines (starting July 26)

Events

January
 January 5 – Senator Panfilo Lacson leaves the Philippines, shortly before charges against him were filed for being the alleged mastermind in the murder of publicist Bubby Dacer and his driver Emmanuel Corbito as claimed by former policeman Cesar Mancao.
 January 14 – Dr. Mercedes B. Concepcion and Dr. Ernesto O. Domingo were conferred the title and rank of National Scientist for Demography and Internal Medicine, respectively.

February
 February 2 – Biñan becomes a city in the province of Laguna through ratification of Republic Act 9740 which was approved on October 30, 2009.

March
 March 4 – National Scientist Lourdes J. Cruz is recognized as one of the five laureates of L'Oreal-UNESCO Awards for Women in Science for the discovery of conotoxins produced by certain marine snails that can serve as painkillers and pharmaceutical probes to study brain function.

May
 May 10 – Automated national elections are held in the Philippines for the first time.

June

 June 13 – Thomas S. Monson dedicates the Cebu City Philippines Temple.
 June 30 – 
 Benigno S. Aquino III is inaugurated as the 15th President of the Philippines at the Quirino Grandstand.
 The Bataan Export Processing Zone (BEPZ) or Bataan Economic Zone (BEZ), the first official economic zone in the Philippines and located in Mariveles, Bataan, became Freeport Area of Bataan (FAB), with Philippine Economic Zone Authority (PEZA) turned over the zone's operations and management to Authority of the Freeport Area of Bataan (AFAB), as a result of the implementation of Freeport Area of Bataan Act (Republic Act 9728) which was enacted into law on October 23, 2009 during the administration of Benigno Aquino III's predecessor, Gloria Macapagal Arroyo, and pursuant to Section 28 of the said law.

July
 July 14 – Typhoon Conson, locally known as Basyang, hits Metro Manila.
 July 26 – President Benigno S. Aquino III delivers his first State of the Nation Address (SONA).

August
 August 2 – Ivan Padilla, leader of a notorious carjacking group, is killed following a shootout with law enforcers in Makati.
 August 18 – A bus bound for La Union plunges into a 150-foot deep ravine in Sablan, Benguet, killing 42 passengers and injured 9 others including the driver and the conductor.

 August 23:
Hostage-taking incident in Quirino Grandstand. This incident causes the straining of ties between Hong Kong and the Philippines.
The Supreme Court reinstates its November 18, 2008 ruling which declared unconstitutional the cityhood laws of Baybay, Leyte; Bogo, Cebu; Catbalogan, Samar; Tandag, Surigao del Sur; Lamitan, Basilan; Borongan, Eastern Samar; Tayabas, Quezon; Tabuk, Kalinga; Bayugan, Agusan del Sur; Batac, Ilocos Norte; Mati, Davao Oriental; Guihulngan, Negros Oriental; Cabadbaran, Agusan del Norte; El Salvador, Misamis Oriental; Carcar, Cebu and Naga, Cebu causing these cities to become regular municipalities again.
 August 31 – Filipino physicists Christopher Bernido and Ma. Victoria Carpio-Bernido are among this year's recipients of the Ramon Magsaysay Awards.

September

 September 26 – An explosion rocks the De La Salle University in Manila during the last day of the 2010 Bar Exams.
 September 30 – Activist, artist and tour guide Carlos Celdran is arrested for shouting and bearing a sign with the word "Dámaso" at the Manila Cathedral during an ecumenical service, to protest the bishops' stance against abortion and contraception.

October

 October 18 – Typhoon Megi, locally known as Juan, hits northern Luzon. It was among the most intense tropical cyclones ever recorded.
 October 25 – Barangay and Sangguniang Kabataan (SK) elections are held in the Philippines.

November
 November 23 – Department of Tourism (DOT) Undersecretary Vicente Romano III officially resigns his post, as a result of a controversial tourism promotion campaign called "Pilipinas Kay Ganda".
 November 30 – Former policeman Gerardo Biong, convicted in the Vizconde massacre case, is freed after 15 years of imprisonment. Biong is found guilty of burning bedsheets and tampering with other evidence in the crime.

December
 December 6 – The Department of Interior and Local Government (DILG) creates a tracker team to hunt down Senator Panfilo Lacson. The team was composed of members of the Philippine National Police (PNP) and the National Bureau of Investigation (NBI).
 December 7 – The Supreme Court (SC) declares as "unconstitutional" Executive Order No. 1, creating the Truth Commission. The Philippine Truth Commission was created by President Benigno Aquino III and tasked to investigate cases of graft and corruption during the Arroyo administration.
 December 10 – President Benigno S. Aquino III orders the release of "Morong 43" (43 health workers arrested as suspected communist rebels in February 2010), saying their rights were violated.
 December 14 – Hubert Webb and six other convicted in the Vizconde massacre case are acquitted by the Supreme Court, based primarily on inconsistent testimonies of witness Jessica Alfaro during trial.
 December 16 – The Bangko Sentral ng Pilipinas (Central Bank of the Philippines) announces the release of new peso bills and presented their new design.
 December 20 – After seven years in detention, Senator Antonio Trillanes IV is released from jail.

Holidays

On December 11, 2009, Republic Act No. 9849 declared Eidul Adha as a regular holiday. Also amending Executive Order No. 292, also known as The Administrative Code of 1987, the following are regular and special days shall be observed. The EDSA Revolution Anniversary was proclaimed since 2002 as a special nonworking holiday. On February 25, 2004, Republic Act No. 9256 declared every August 21 as a special nonworking holiday to be known as Ninoy Aquino Day. Note that in the list, holidays in bold are "regular holidays" and those in italics are "nationwide special days".

 January 1 – New Year's Day
 February 25 – EDSA Revolution Anniversary
 April 1 – Maundy Thursday
 April 2 – Good Friday
 April 9 – Araw ng Kagitingan (Day of Valor)
 May 1 – Labor Day
 June 12 – Independence Day 
 August 21 – Ninoy Aquino Day
 August 29 – National Heroes Day
 September 9 – Eidul Fitr
 November 1 –  All Saints Day
 November 15 – Eid al-Adha
 November 30 – Bonifacio Day
 December 25 – Christmas Day
 December 30 – Rizal Day
 December 31 – Last Day of the Year

In addition, several other places observe local holidays, such as the foundation of their town. These are also "special days."

Television

 August 24 – Venus Raj is placed fourth runner up in the 2010 Miss Universe pageant.

Films
Highest grossing Filipino films for the year.

Music

This includes music albums of all kinds released this year, concerts and formations (band or new singers).

Albums
 January 28 – Unforgettable – Gabby Concepcion (Warner Music Philippines)
 February 13 – Juris – Juris (Star Records)
 March 17 – Try Love – Joanna Ampil (Sony Music Entertainment Philippines)
 March 23 – Eto Pa! – Brownman Revival (Sony Music Entertainment Philippines)
 June 5 – In Love & War – Francis Magalona & Ely Buendia (Sony Music Entertainment Philippines)
 September 6 – Middle-Aged Juvenile Novelty Pop-Rockers – Parokya Ni Edgar (Universal Records Philippines)

Concerts
 January 10 – Sharon Cuneta: The Mega Birthday Concert, live at the Araneta Coliseum
 February 5–7 – 4minute Live at SM Supermalls
 February 6 – Musicfest 2010: Kris Allen, JabbaWockeeZ and Boyce Avenue Live at Fort Bonifacio, Taguig
 February 26–27 – Toni Gonzaga: Love Is..., live at the Music Museum
 February 27 – Backstreet Boys – This Is Us World Tour Live at the Araneta Coliseum
 March 5–6 – Nina, live at the Music Museum
 March 6 – FT Island Manila 2010 Showcase – F.T. Island (PICC Plenary Hall)
 March 9 – Paramore Live in Manila!- SM Mall of Asia Concert Grounds
 March 12–13 – Christian Bautista: Romance Revisited – Christian Bautista (Music Museum)
 March 14 – Owl City, live at TriNoma Mindanao Open Parking Area
 March 25–27 – Cobra Starship: Live at Ayala Malls
 March 27 – Changing Lives: Justin Timberlake, Timbaland and Jojo live at SM Mall of Asia Open Grounds
 March 28 – Tom Jones, live at Araneta Coliseum
 April 10 – Super Junior: Live at the Araneta Coliseum
 April 17 – Pulp Summer Slam 2010 feat. Lamb of God and Testament: Live at Amoranto Stadium
 May 1 – Kelly Clarkson, live at Araneta Coliseum
 May 2 – Tears For Fears, live at Araneta Coliseum
 May 4 – Allison Iraheta, live at Robinson's Place Manila
 May 15 – Then & Now; feat. All-4-One, JoJo, Diana King, SWV, VFactory, TQ, P.M. Dawn etc. live at SM Mall of Asia Open Grounds
 May 17 – Protest Broadcast: live at the Araneta Coliseum
 May 27 – Dashboard Confessional, live at TriNoma Mindanao Open Parking Area
 June 14 – U-KISS: live at the Araneta Coliseum
 June 19 – K-Pop meets P-Pop, feat. U-KISS, Pop Girls and XLR8, live at the Araneta Coliseum
 June 22 – Engelbert Humperdinck, live at the Araneta Coliseum
 June 25 – Air Supply, live at SMX Convention Center
 July 9 – Usher, live at SM Mall of Asia open grounds
 July 15–17 – Charice, live at the Eastwood City malls
 July 16 – As 1 The Repeat, live at the Araneta Coliseum
 July 23–25 – Jason Derulo, live at the Ayala Malls
 July 27 – The Lettermen and The Cascades, live in Manila
 July 30–August 1 – One Way live at SM Supermalls
 July 31 – La Diva Unleashed, live at the Music Museum
 August 13 – Boyz II Men, live at the Araneta Coliseum
 August 21 – La Diva Unleashed: The Repeat; feat. Harry Santos, Gian Magdangal and Jan Nieto, live at the Music Museum
 September 3 – Jay Sean, live at the Araneta Coliseum
 September 10 – ASAP Sessionistas live in General Santos
 September 11: 
 Rock with Arnel Pineda, live at Metro Concert Bar
 Citipointe Live, at the Philsports Arena
 Intensity feat. Rain and U-KISS, live at the SM Mall of Asia open grounds
 September 11, 18 & 25 – Billy Crawford in 25 B.C., live at the Music Museum
 September 16, 17, 22, 23, 29 & 30 – Gary V in Soul in Motion, live at the Music Museum
 September 18: 
 Supahfest; feat. T-Pain, Flo Rida, Kelly Rowland and Sean Kingston, live at the SM Mall of Asia open grounds
 The Spinners, live at the Araneta Coliseum
 September 24–25 – Erik Santos: The Power of One, live at the Meralco Theater
 October 1 – John Mayer, live at SM Mall of Asia open grounds
 October 3 – Jay Park, live at SMX Convention Center Hall 1
 October 7 – Just Jade: Jade Ecleo feat. Jay-R and Dingdong Avanzado, live at Metro Concert Bar
 October 8 – Ogie Alcasid and Ryan Cayabyab: Ogie & Mr. C, live at the PICC Plenary Hall
 October 10 – Adam Lambert, live at SM Mall of Asia open grounds
 October 15 – Tanduay Rhum Rock Fest, live at SM Mall of Asia open grounds
 October 15–17 – Pokwang: Endangered Species, live at Aliw Theater
 October 16: 
 Jack Jones: Greatest Hits Tour live at the Araneta Coliseum
 Jolly Kids Meal presents Kids Who Can Concert, at the Ninoy Aquino Stadium
 October 17 – The Cascades: live at the PAGCOR Theater
 October 22 – Taylor Swift live in Manila (cancelled)
 October 23 – David Foster and Friends feat. Natalie Cole, Ruben Studdard, Peter Cetera, Charice and The Canadian Tenors: live at the Araneta Coliseum
 October 30 – Pointen live at SM Bacoor
 November 6 – Hatebreed: live at World Trade Center, Pasay
 November 12 – Richard Poon – The Crooner: live at the PICC Plenary Hall
 November 13 – Faithfully...Jovit Baldivino: live at the Aliw Theater
 November 16 – David Archuleta live at SM North EDSA
 November 18 – Gin Blossoms: live at the Araneta Coliseum
 November 18 – December 4: Magsimula Ka: live at the Music Museum
 November 19 – Ai-Ai delas Alas – Akin Ang Tronong 'To!: live at the Araneta Coliseum
 November 26 – Imelda Papin & Dionisia Pacquiao: live at Araneta Coliseum
 November 27:
 Dionne Warwick: live at the Araneta Coliseum
 Ely Buendia: XL – Xtra Live at 40: live at Republiq in New Resorts World
 November 28 – Jed Madela: A Classic Christmas, live at the Newport Performing Arts Theater, Resorts World
 November 29 – Jay-R & Kyla: Soulmates, live at the Music Museum
 December 3 – Ugat the Legends of Pinoy Rock: live at Araneta Coliseum
 December 7 – G-Force: About Phase: live at San Juan Gym
 December 9 – IDO4: live at the Araneta Coliseum
 December 10 – Bone Thugs n Harmony: live at SMX Convention Center
 December 16–19 – The Little Big Club: live at the Aliw Theater

Formations
 Zion
 100 Percent
 XLR8

Sports
 February 13, Boxing – Nonito Donaire won against Manuel Vargas via knockout in the third round to retain the interim WBA super flyweight title
 March 13, Boxing – Manny Pacquiao defeats Joshua Clottey, controlling the fight from start to finish and winning by unanimous decision. This was the first boxing match held at Cowboys Stadium in Arlington, Texas, drawing more than 41,000 people. This was Pacquiao's first defense of his newly awarded WBO welterweight title.
 September 12, Cheerleading – The UP Pep Squad won the UAAP Cheerdance Competition. FEU Tamaraws placed second, while the UST Salinggawi Dance Troupe placed third.
 September 30 – UAAP Season 73: Ateneo Blue Eagles was the 3-peat Championship Crown Against FEU Tamaraws with the final score 65–62.
 October 15 – NCAA Season 86: San Beda Red Lions wins championship again after defeating San Sebastian Golden Stags in 2009.
 November 12–27, Multi Sport Event – The Philippines is participating at the 2010 Asian Games in Guangzhou, China.
 November 13, Boxing – In a unanimous decision, Manny Pacquiao defeated Antonio Margarito and claimed the vacant WBC Super Welterweight boxing championship.
 December 4, Boxing: – Nonito Donaire won against Wladimir Sidorenko via knockout in the fourth round to win the vacant WBC Continental Americas bantamweight title.
 December 6, Football: – The Philippines national football team defeated Vietnam by the score of 2–0 in the 2010 AFF Suzuki Cup, in what is considered one of the biggest upsets ever recorded in the regional tournament.

Births
 February 11 – Yuan Francisco, child actor
 February 19 – Alonzo Muhlach, child actor
 March 11 – Ashley Cabrera, child actress
 June 16 – Angelica Ulip, actress
 September 15 – Robbie Wachtel, child actor, print ad and commercial model
 October 1 – Onyok Pineda, child actor
 October 14 – Leanne Bautista, child actress

Deaths
 January 6 – Mila Ocampo, former actress and mother of Snooky Serna (b. 1941)
 January 18 – Celestino Tugot, Filipino professional golfer
 January 19 – Cerge Remonde, former Press Secretary (b. 1958)
 February 14 – Josie Lichauco, former DOTC Secretary (b. 1934)
 February 21 – Albader Parad, senior leader of Abu Sayyaf, Islamic rebels
 February 26 – Oscar Obligacion, veteran comedian (b. 1924)
 February 28 – Boy Mayor, former Jueteng whistle blower (b. 1954)
 March 5 – Marco Polo Garcia, former child star (b. 1970)
 March 15:
 Emilia Boncodin, former budget secretary, whistle-blower in ZTE-NBN controversy (b. 1954)
 Joseph Galdon, SJ, former dean of the Ateneo de Manila University
 March 25 – Tan Chu Lim, founder and chairman Emeritus of LCC Malls (b. 1906)
 April 7 – Philip Medel, suspect in Nida Blanca case
 April 12: 
 Palito (Reynaldo Hipolito), veteran comedian (b. 1934)
 Miguel Cinches, former Bishop of Surigao from 1973 to 2001 (b. 1932)
 April 18 – Ricardo Marata, former PBA guard (b. 1964)
 April 22 – Fred Panopio, folk singer (b. 1941)
 April 27 – Armando Sanchez, former Batangas governor (b. 1953)
 April 29 – Jojo Acuin, popular psychic of the stars (b. 1957)
 May 3 – Florencio Campomanes, Filipino chess player, President Emeritus of FIDE (b. 1927)
 May 17 – Raffy P. Nantes, former governor of Quezon (b. 1957)
 June 13 – Emilio Macias, Filipino politician, Governor of Negros Oriental (b. 1933)
 June 14 – Desidario Camangyan, radio journalist (b. 1952)
 June 16 – Joselito Agustin, Filipino radio journalist (b. 1976) 
 June 30 – Fran Ribaño, fashion designer (b. 1966)
 July 1 – Francisco F. Claver, Filipino Roman Catholic prelate, Bishop of Malaybalay (1969–1984). (b. 1928)
 July 10 – Adelina Barrion, Filipino entomologist and geneticist
 July 22:
 Florencio Vargas, former governor of Cagayan, Representative of the 2nd District of Cagayan (b. 1931)
 Magnolia Antonino, 94, former Senator and grandmother of congresswoman Darlene Antonino-Custodio (b. 1915)
 July 23 – Prospero Luna, comedian-actor (b. 1931)
 July 25 – Redford White (Cipriano Cermeno II), actor and comedian (b. 1955)
 August 1 – Orlando Olgado, Filipino actor TV and radio anchor (b. 1942)
 August 8 – Charlie Davao, Filipino actor, father of actor Ricky Davao (b. 1934)
 August 11 – Margaret Jao-Grey, Filipino journalist and columnist Philippine Star and Business Mirror (b. 1952)
 August 16 – Nestor Escaño, Radyo Patrol pioneer (b. 1933)
 August 20 – Lourdes Libres Rosaroso, Cebuano radio broadcaster (b. 1935)
 August 21 – Melody Gersbach, Binibining Pilipinas International 2009 (b. 1986)
 September 16 – Butch Albarracin, founder of Center for Pop Music Philippines (b. 1946)
 October 3 – Abraham Sarmiento, former Supreme Court Associate Justice 1987–1991 (b. 1921)
 October 7 – Metring David, actress-comedian (b. 1920)
 October 30 – Kirk Abella, Filipino actor (b. 1978)
 November 1 – Ernesto Presas, martial arts grandmaster. (b. 1945)
 November 3 – Saklolo Leano, lawyer.
 November 4 – Ophelia Alcantara Dimalanta, poet & academic, hypertension. (b. 1933)
 November 10 – Prospero Oreta, former MMDA chairman (b. 1942)
 November 15 – Leonardo Co, botanist & academic (b. 1953)
 November 16 – Wyngard Tracy, talent manager & television personality
 November 21 – Gregorio Oca, chairman of the Associated Marine Officers and Seamens Union of the Philippines (b. 1926)
 November 29 – Hortensia Starke, former Representative from Negros Occidental (b. 1921)
 December 9 – Felix Maramba Jr., industrialist (b. 1924)
 December 19 – Leonardo Siguion Reyna, lawyer and ex-ConCon delegate (b. 1921)
 December 26 – Pablo Gomez, writer, radio announcer of DZRH and director (b. 1929)
 December 29 – Rejoice Rivera (Diane Marie Santos), singer, dancer & member of Baywalk Bodies (b. 1984)

References

 
2010 in Southeast Asia
Philippines
2010s in the Philippines
Years of the 21st century in the Philippines